Rugby Challenge 2006 is a 2006 rugby union video game. There are a number of tournaments that can be played in the game, both club and international competition. In addition there is a career mode (which includes trade/recruitment/management etc.), full training mode, as well as player/team/tournament editor.

There are a number of 'Challenge Modes' as well; Survival mode, Classic mode and Superstar mode. Classic games/teams can also be unlocked. The in-game commentators are John Inverdale and Dewi Morris. The game has multiplayer up to 4 people.

Covers
There are a number of different cover arts for the game; one features four different rugby union players (one from England, Wales, Ireland and Scotland), one features a number of Italian players, another has a Biarritz player (Dimitri Yachvili), and another has no rugby player, but a rugby ball on the cover.

See also
 Rugby 06
 World Championship Rugby

External links
 Rugby-Challenge.com
 Rugby Challenge 2006

2006 video games
PlayStation 2 games
Rugby union video games
Video games developed in the United Kingdom
Windows games
Xbox games
Multiplayer and single-player video games
Ubisoft games